Ana Mari Cauce (born January 11, 1956) is an American psychologist and academic administrator, currently serving as the 33rd president of the University of Washington since October 2015.

Early life and education 
Cauce was born in Havana, Cuba, to Vicente Cauce, minister of education under Cuban dictator Fulgencio Batista, and Ana Cauce (née Vivanco). When she was three years old, her family, including her brother César, fled the island during the Cuban revolution. She grew up in Miami, Florida, where her father, who held a PhD, worked first as a custodian. Eventually both parents worked in a shoe factory.

in 1977, Cauce earned a Bachelor of Arts summa cum laude in English from the University of Miami. In 1979, she earned a Master of Science in psychology and in 1982 a Master of Philosophy from Yale University. In 1984, she earned a PhD doctorate from Yale University in psychology, with a concentration in child clinical and community psychology. While at Yale, she studied with Edmund W. Gordon.

Career 
Cauce began her teaching career as a lecturer at the University of Delaware. In 1986, she moved to Seattle to work as an associate professor at the University of Washington, where she gained tenure in 1990. In 1996 she was named chair of the American Ethnic Studies department. Cauce then was appointed the Director of the Honors Program. She later became Dean of the College of Arts and Sciences.

In 2007, Cauce helped launch The Husky Promise, a tuition-funding program at the university.

In 2012, she became Provost of the University of Washington.

On October 13, 2015, Cauce was appointed president of the University of Washington by its Board of Regents. She had served as interim president since March 2015, when her predecessor Michael Young announced his departure. She is the first permanent woman president, and is also the first gay and first Hispanic selected as president. In 2017, the university settled a public records lawsuit related to the selection of Cauce.

Personal life 
In 1979, Cauce's older brother, César Cauce, a  well-known communist activist, was killed in the Greensboro massacre. He and the other three white male victims were buried in Greensboro at a traditionally black cemetery.

Cauce is married to professor Susan Joslyn, her partner since 1989.

Leadership positions 
 Museum of Pop Culture (f/k/a Experience Music Project), Trustee
 Museum of Pop Culture, Board Vice President
 Technology Alliance, Board Member

Honors and awards 
Cauce was elected fellow of the American Academy of Arts and Sciences in 2020.

Works and publications 
 
Selected articles

References

External links 
 Ani Mari Cauce at University of Washington
 

People from Havana
Cuban refugees
Cuban emigrants to the United States
University of Miami alumni
Yale Graduate School of Arts and Sciences alumni
Women heads of universities and colleges
University of Delaware faculty
University of Washington faculty
Living people
Presidents of the University of Washington
Lesbian academics
1956 births
American academic administrators
Fellows of the American Academy of Arts and Sciences
21st-century LGBT people